This article lists all Welsh Poor Law Unions. Note for table: 'PLU' stands for Poor Law Union and 'PLP' stands for Poor Law Parish.

Anglesey
Link to 1888 map showing Anglesey PLUs; 
Link to 1909 map showing Anglesey PLUs; Link to 1924 map showing Anglesey PLUs

Brecknockshire
Link to 1888 map showing Brecknockshire PLUs; Link to 1909 map showing Brecknockshire PLUs; Link to 1925 map showing Brecknockshire PLUs

Caernarvonshire
Link to 1888 map showing Carnarvonshire PLUs; 
Link to 1909 map showing Carnarvonshire PLUs; Link to 1924 map showing Carnarvonshire PLUs

Cardiganshire
Link to 1888 map showing Cardiganshire PLUs; 
Link to 1909 map showing Cardiganshire PLUs; Link to 1925 map showing Cardiganshire PLUs

Carmarthenshire
Link to 1888 map showing Carmarthenshire PLUs; 
Link to 1925 map showing Carmarthenshire PLUs

Denbighshire
Link to 1888 map showing Denbighshire PLUs; 
Link to 1909 map showing Denbighshire PLUs; Link to 1924 map showing Denbighshire PLUs

Flintshire
Link to 1888 map showing Flintshire PLUs; 
Link to 1909 map showing Flintshire PLUs; Link to 1924 map showing Flintshire PLUs

Glamorganshire
Link to 1888 map showing Glamorganshire PLUs; 
Link to 1908 map showing Glamorganshire PLUs; Link to 1924 map showing Glamorganshire PLUs

Merionethshire
Link to 1888 map showing Merionethshire PLUs; 
Link to 1909 map showing Merionethshire PLUs; Link to 1924 map showing Merionethshire PLUs

Monmouthshire
Link to 1888 map showing Monmouthshire PLUs; 
Link to 1909 map showing Monmouthshire PLUs; Link to 1925 map showing Monmouthshire PLUs

Montgomeryshire
Link to 1888 map showing Montgomeryshire PLUs; 
Link to 1910 map showing Montgomeryshire PLUs; Link to 1924 map showing Montgomeryshire PLUs

Pembrokeshire
Link to 1888 map showing Pembrokeshire PLUs; 
Link to 1910 map showing Pembrokeshire PLUs; Link to 1925 map showing Pembrokeshire PLUs

Radnorshire
Link to 1888 map showing Radnorshire PLUs; 
Link to 1909 map showing Radnorshire PLUs; Link to 1924 map showing Radnorshire PLUs

References